The 2019 Louisiana Ragin' Cajuns baseball team represented the University of Louisiana at Lafayette in the 2019 NCAA Division I baseball season. The Ragin' Cajuns played their home games at M. L. Tigue Moore Field at Russo Park and were led by twenty-fifth year head coach Tony Robichaux.

This season would also be their last with Robichaux at the helm of the program. This came after Robichaux’s death on July 3, 2019 after suffering from a massive heart attack. Days prior to his death, the university hosted a prayer vigil at Russo Park in which hundreds of fans attended to pray for their coach. Robichaux's funeral procession passed through campus and around the Baseball stadium on the way to his burial in Crowley, Louisiana. During opening weekend of the 2020 season, former players of Robichaux unveiled a statue dedicated to him outside of the Tigue.

Preseason

Sun Belt Conference Coaches Poll
The Sun Belt Conference Coaches Poll was released on January 30, 2019. Louisiana was picked to finish first in the West Division with 71 votes and 11 first-place votes.

Preseason All-Sun Belt team

Seth Shuman (GASO, JR, Pitcher)
Hunter Gaddis (GSU, JR, Pitcher)
Gunner Leger (LA, SR, Pitcher)
Matt Eardensohn (CCU, SR, Pitcher)
Carter Perkins (USA, SR, Catcher)
Kyle McDonald (ARST, SR, First Base)
Corey Wood (CCU, JR, Second Base)
Hayden Cantrelle (LA, SO, Shortstop)
Drew Frederic (TROY, JR, Third Base)
Parker Chavers (CCU, SO, Outfield)
Daniel Lahare (LA, SR, Outfield)
Rigsby Mosley (TROY, SO, Outfield)
Ryan Glass (GSU, SO, Designated Hitter)
Brandon Bell (GSU, SR, Utility)

Roster

Coaching staff

Schedule and results

Schedule Source:
*Rankings are based on the team's current ranking in the D1Baseball poll.

References

Louisiana
Louisiana Ragin' Cajuns baseball seasons
Louisiana Ragin' Cajuns baseball